Jonna Ann Keener Mazet (born December 18, 1967) is an American epidemiologist and Executive Director of the University of California, Davis One Health Institute. Recognized for her innovative and holistic approach to emerging environmental and global health threats, she is an elected member of the National Academy of Medicine and a fellow of the American Association for the Advancement of Science. Mazet is a professor of Epidemiology and Disease Ecology at the UC Davis School of Veterinary Medicine, where she focuses on global health problem solving, especially for emerging infectious disease and conservation challenges.

Mazet is a leader in the field of One Health and is active in international research programs, most notably in relation to disease transmission among wildlife, domestic animals, and people and the ecological drivers of disease emergence. One Health is the collaborative effort across multiple disciplines (veterinary, human medical, environmental, etc.) to attain optimal health for animals, people, and the environment. As a member of the National Academy of Medicine, Mazet also chairs the National Academies’ One Health Action Collaborative and serves on the Forum for Microbial Threats.

She is the Global Director of the PREDICT Project, a more than $200 million viral emergence early-warning project that has been developed with the United States Agency for International Development’s (USAID) Emerging Pandemic Threats Program.

Mazet was born and raised in Marin County, California and currently lives both there and in Davis, California, USA with her husband. She has two daughters.

Education and early career 
Mazet earned her Bachelor of Science in Veterinary Medicine from the University of California, Davis in 1990 and her Master of Preventive Veterinary Medicine in Wildlife and Infectious Disease and her Doctor of Veterinary Medicine in 1992. In 1996, she completed a PhD in epidemiology, expanding her training across human and animal species divides.

Mazet worked as a wildlife veterinarian for the California Department of Fish and Wildlife where she was instrumental in the development of California’s Oiled Wildlife Care Network (OWCN). While working as an oil spill responder, she advanced the collaborative Network, making it a model for wildlife emergency management systems worldwide, and remains a consulting expert on animal emergency preparedness and response.

She joined the faculty of the UC Davis School of Veterinary Medicine in 1998 and became Co-director of the fledgling Wildlife Health Center and moved the headquarters of the OWCN to the university.

In 2009, she became Executive Director of the newly formed UC Davis One Health Institute, which is home to programs and projects that do work around the world, including the Karen C. Drayer Wildlife Health Center, PREDICT Project, Gorilla Doctors, SeaDoc Society, EpiCenter for Disease Dynamics and the California Raptor Center.

Viral discovery and pandemic preparedness 
Mazet is currently the Principal Investigator and Global Director of USAID’s PREDICT Project, which works in more than 30 countries to build capacity to develop surveillance systems and complete the necessary research to halt the next pandemic, like influenza, SARS, Ebola, and HIV. With these projects and others as a research foundation, she has served as the mentor for over 70 graduate student and postdoctoral trainees. She also serves on the National Academies of Science, Engineering & Medicine Forum on Microbial Threats. She also co-authored the following recent publications: The discovery of Bombali virus adds further support for bats as hosts of ebolaviruses (Nature Microbiology) and The Global Virome Project (Science).

Honors and awards 
2017 - Fellow, American Association for the Advancement of Science (AAAS)

2017 - Honorable Mention, Remarkable Women of UC, University of California

2017 - Inaugural Hall-Sewankambo Mid-Career Global Health Award, Consortium of Universities for Global Health

2017 - Alumni Achievement Award, UC Davis School of Veterinary Medicine

2016 - Leiter Lecturer, National Library of Medicine (NIH) and National Medical Library Association

2016 - Schofield Metal, Ontario Veterinary College, University of Guelph

2016 - Zoetis Award for Veterinary Research Excellence

2015 - George C. Poppensiek Visiting Professor in Global Animal Health, Cornell University

2015 - American Veterinary Epidemiology Society Honorary Diplomate

2014 - R.G. Thomson Lecturer, Atlantic Veterinary College, University of Prince Edward Island (Canada)

2013 - Elected to the National Academy of Medicine (formerly Institute of Medicine)

2012 - Oscar W. Schalm Lecturer, University of California, Davis

2012 - Outstanding Alumna Award, University of California, Davis

2011 - International Wildlife Disease Association and American Association of Wildlife Veterinarians Joint Tom Thorne and Beth Williams Memorial Award – Most significant contribution to the field of wildlife health

2004 - Appointed to Governor of California’s Oil Spill Technical Advisory Committee

References

External links 
 UC Davis One Health Institute  
 US Agency for International Development
 PREDICT Project
 Karen C. Drayer Wildlife Health Center
 Oiled Wildlife Care Network

1967 births
Living people
University of California, Davis alumni
American women epidemiologists
American epidemiologists
21st-century American women
Members of the National Academy of Medicine